The Filmfare Marathi Awards are presented annually to both artistic and technical excellence of professionals in the Marathi film industry of India. The ceremony had been sponsored by various private organisations in the past as well as in present provisions. During several years in 1990s, a live ceremony was broadcast to television audiences but was later discontinued due to unknown reasons. The presentation of the awards has been inconsistent throughout its inception. Presently, a recorded and edited version of the awards ceremony is televised.

Previous winners
Marathi Cinema

Main awards
1963

1964

1965

1966

1967

 1968

1969

1970

1971

1972 

1973

1974

1975

1976

1977

1978

1979

1980

1981

1982

1983

1985

1999

Ajeenkya DY Patil Filmfare Awards Marathi 2014 
The nominations for Filmfare Marathi Awards 2014.

 Critics' awards

 Technical Awards

 Special awards

Karrm Filmfare Awards Marathi 2015
The nomination for Filmfare Marathi Awards 2015.

 Critics' awards

 Technical Awards

 Special awards

Jio Filmfare Awards Marathi 2016
The nomination for Filmfare Marathi Awards 2016.

 Critics' awards

 Technical Awards

 Special awards

Jio Filmfare Awards Marathi 2017
The nomination for Filmfare Marathi Awards 2018.

 Critics' awards

 Technical Awards

 Special awards

Planet Filmfare Awards Marathi 2020
The nomination for Filmfare Marathi Awards 2020.

 Critics' awards

 Technical Awards

 Special awards

Planet Filmfare Awards Marathi 2021
The awards ceremony was held on 31st March 2021 at St. Andrews, Bandra, Mumbai. Winners were:

Awards 
As of 2017, there are total 31 awards given in different categories. There is a separate category of critics awards, decided by noted film-critics rather than popular votes. Awards are given in the following categories. Follow the links for lists of the award winners, year by year.

Merit awards

Critics' awards 
 Critics Award Best Film
 Critics Award Best Actor 
 Critics Award Best Actress

Technical awards

Special awards 
 Lifetime Achievement

Ceremonies
 6th Filmfare Awards Marathi, was held on 31 March 2022 in Bandra, Mumbai
 5th Filmfare Awards Marathi, was held on 28 February 2021 in Mumbai, Maharashtra 
 4th Filmfare Awards Marathi, was held on 27 September 2018 in Mumbai, Maharashtra
 3rd Filmfare Awards Marathi, was held on 27 October 2017 in Mumbai, Maharashtra
 2nd Filmfare Awards Marathi, was held on 28 November 2016 in Mumbai, Maharashtra
 1st Filmfare Awards Marathi, was held on 20 November 2015 in Thane, Maharashtra

See also
 Filmfare Awards
 Bollywood
 Cinema of India

References

Marathi
.
Film industry in Mumbai

Maharashtra awards
1963 establishments in Maharashtra
Awards established in 1963